Massimiliano Angelelli (born 15 December 1966) is a retired Italian racecar driver. He won the 2005 and 2017 24 Hours of Daytona and the 2001 Six Hours at the Glen. Also he was the Grand-Am Rolex Sports Car Series champion in 2005 and 2013, as well as runner-up in 2010 and 2011.

Angelelli was co-founder of Wayne Taylor Racing, where he drove until his retirement in 2017. In 2020 he left WTR and began working at sports prototype projects for Italian manufacturer Dallara.

Career 

His career began in Italian Formula Alfa Boxer in 1987 and continued for 15 years. His only championship win was the 1992 Italian Formula Three title. Following that win he also raced German Formula Three (1993–1995), Macau Grand Prix for Formula 3 (1996), FIA GT Championship (1997–1998), All Japan Grand Touring Car Championship (select races in 1998), and American Le Mans Series (1999–2002).

Angelelli is nicknamed the Axe, coined by Leigh Diffey because he has a knack of closing up and "chopping" off seconds behind the leader quickly in a race to set himself up to make a clean pass for the win.

Angelelli had a banner year in 2005. Angelelli and teammate Wayne Taylor won the 24 Hours of Daytona and captured the 2005 Grand American Daytona Prototype championship.

Angelelli was selected to run in the 2006 IROC series in America, along with teammate Wayne Taylor, becoming the first tandem in IROC history.

Angelelli is also known for being the safety car driver in the 1994 San Marino Grand Prix. Ayrton Senna followed Angelelli's safety car for 5 laps before his fatal accident.

For the past several years, Angelelli has driven for the Wayne Taylor Sun Trust Racing Team in the Daytona Prototype class of the Grand Am Racing Series, a class that requires two drivers per car. He has teamed up with Ricky Taylor, the son of team owner Wayne Taylor.

For 2013 Angelelli was again with Wayne Taylor Racing/Velocity Worldwide but Taylor's son Ricky had left to pursue another driving opportunity.  This left a driver vacancy on the team which was quickly filled by Taylor's younger son Jordan.  Together Jordan and Angelelli made a potent combination and won the final Grand-Am Driver's Title, narrowly beating Scott Pruett and Memo Rojas who had won the championship 4 of the previous 5 years.

In 2017, Angelelli announced that he would compete in his last career 24 Hours of Daytona for Wayne Taylor Racing alongside the Taylor brothers and Jeff Gordon. The team went on to win the race.

Motorsports career results

24 Hours of Le Mans results

WeatherTech SportsCar Championship results
(key)(Races in bold indicate pole position, Results are overall/class)

* Season still in progress

International Race of Champions
(key) (Bold – Pole position. * – Most laps led.)

 Ride shared with Wayne Taylor

References

External links 
 Max Angelelli Home Page
 

1966 births
Rolex Sports Car Series drivers
International Race of Champions drivers
Italian racing drivers
24 Hours of Le Mans drivers
Living people
International Formula 3000 drivers
Sportspeople from Bologna
American Le Mans Series drivers
FIA GT Championship drivers
German Formula Three Championship drivers
Italian Formula Three Championship drivers
Austrian Formula Three Championship drivers
24 Hours of Daytona drivers
WeatherTech SportsCar Championship drivers
Opel Team BSR drivers
Wayne Taylor Racing drivers
DAMS drivers
RC Motorsport drivers